Jekhane Ashray is a 2009 Bengali drama film directed by Amitabha Mitra. This film was released under the banner Amitabha Mitra Productions.

Cast
 Mahua Roychoudhury
 Nirmal Kumar
 Gita Dey
 Debraj Ray
 Ratna Ghoshal
 Soumitra Bandyopadhyay
 Joy Bandyopadhyay

References

External links
 
 Jekhane Ashray at the Gomolo

2009 films
Bengali-language Indian films
2000s Bengali-language films
Indian family films